Csaba Szórád (born 9 May 1980, in Komárno) is a Slovak football player, currently plays for KFC Komárno.

External links

References

1980 births
Living people
Hungarians in Slovakia
Association football defenders
Slovak footballers
FC Nitra players
MŠK Žilina players
AS Trenčín players
Slovak Super Liga players
Sportspeople from Komárno